The Women's Giant Slalom in the 2018 FIS Alpine Skiing World Cup involved eight completed events. When the World Cup finals race scheduled in Åre, Sweden was cancelled due to high winds, Viktoria Rebensburg of Germany, who had won three races during the season and held a 92-point lead over defending champion Tessa Worley of France in the discipline standings before the finals, was crowned as discipline champion for the season. 

The season was interrupted by the 2018 Winter Olympics from 12-24 February 2018 at Yongpyong Alpine Centre (slalom and giant slalom) at the Alpensia Sports Park in PyeongChang and at the Jeongseon Alpine Centre (speed events) in Jeongseon, South Korea.  The women's giant slalom was scheduled to be held on 12 February, but high winds forced its postponement to 15 February.

Standings

DNF1 = Did Not Finish run 1
DSQ1 = Disqualified run 1
DNQ = Did Not Qualify for run 2
DNF2 = Did Not Finish run 2
DSQ2 = Disqualified run 2
DNS = Did Not Start

See also
 2018 Alpine Skiing World Cup – Women's summary rankings
 2018 Alpine Skiing World Cup – Women's Overall
 2018 Alpine Skiing World Cup – Women's Downhill
 2018 Alpine Skiing World Cup – Women's Super-G
 2018 Alpine Skiing World Cup – Women's Slalom
 2018 Alpine Skiing World Cup – Women's Combined

References

External links
 Alpine Skiing at FIS website

Women's Giant Slalom
FIS Alpine Ski World Cup women's giant slalom discipline titles